This is a list of administrators and governors of Gombe State, Nigeria. Gombe State was formed on 1 October 1996 from part of the old Bauchi State by the Sani Abacha military government.

See also
States of Nigeria
List of state governors of Nigeria

References

Gombe
Governors